Sukhobuzimsky (masculine), Sukhobuzimskaya (feminine), or Sukhobuzimskoye (neuter) may refer to:
Sukhobuzimsky District, a district in Krasnoyarsk Krai, Russia
Sukhobuzimskoye, a rural locality (selo) in Krasnoyarsk Krai, Russia